Montasola is a  (municipality) in the Province of Rieti in the Italian region of Latium, located about  northeast of Rome and about  west of Rieti.

Montasola borders the following municipalities: Casperia, Contigliano, Cottanello, Torri in Sabina, Vacone.

Among the churches in the town are: Santa Maria Murella, Santi Pietro e Tommaso, and San Michele Arcangelo.

References

External links
 Official website/

Cities and towns in Lazio